Four referendums were held in Switzerland during 1903. The first was held on 15 March on a federal law on tariffs, and was approved by 59.6% of voters. The second, third and fourth were all held on 25 October concerning an amendment to the federal criminal law, a popular initiative on Swiss residents electing the National Council and an amendment to article 32bis of the constitution. All three were rejected by voters.

Background
The referendums on tariffs and the federal criminal law were optional referendums, which required only a majority of the public vote. The referendum on the changes to National Council elections was popular initiative and the referendum on the constitutional amendment was a mandatory referendum, both of which required a double majority; a majority of the popular vote and majority of the cantons. The decision of each canton was based on the vote in that canton. Full cantons counted as one vote, whilst half cantons counted as half.

Results

Tariffs

Criminal law

National Council elections

Amendment of article 32bis of the constitution

References

1903 referendums
1903 in Switzerland
Referendums in Switzerland